The West Sixth Street Bridge is a historic stone arch bridge in downtown Austin, Texas. Built in 1887, the bridge is one of the state's oldest masonry arch bridges. It is located at the site of the first bridge in Austin, carrying Sixth Street across Shoal Creek to link the western and central parts of the old city. The bridge was added to the National Register of Historic Places in 2014.

History
The first bridge within the Austin city limits was built across Shoal Creek at West Sixth Street (then known as "Pecan Street") in 1865. This first bridge, built by the United States Army, was a narrow iron footbridge and could not carry wagon traffic. As the capital city expanded, development west of Shoal Creek increased, and demand for a reliable vehicular crossing grew. At the Austin City Council meeting of January 3, 1887, council instructed the city engineer to estimate the cost of a new, larger bridge at Pecan Street that would match the full  width of the street and permit wagons to cross.

On March 21, 1887, city council allocated $6,126.20 for the construction of a permanent double-arch stone bridge to span the creek; in fact, the bridge was ultimately built with three arches. Construction was completed and the bridge opened to traffic in July 1887, giving wagons, automobiles and streetcars access to the western suburbs that would become the city's West Line Historic District. Since its completion, the bridge has required repairs on numerous occasions (usually due to damage from flooding on Shoal Creek), but the overall design is not believed to have been significantly altered.

Today, the bridge still carries West Sixth Street across Shoal Creek and supports substantial pedestrian and vehicular traffic daily. On August 18, 2014, the structure was added to the National Register of Historic Places in recognition of its significance as a durable work of civil engineering using local materials and a manifestation of nineteenth-century urban planning in Texas's growing capital city. The bridge is also notable for having replaced an iron truss bridge at a time when short-span masonry bridges were commonly being replaced by manufactured trusses.

Design
The West Sixth Street Bridge is a closed-spandrel deck arch bridge built of local limestone. Today the structure carries a concrete roadway surfaced in asphalt concrete, bearing four roadway lanes, along with parallel parking spaces and sidewalks on both sides.

The stonework is of irregularly shaped rusticated blocks, which rise to form a parapet along the bridge's south edge; it is speculated that a matching parapet may have originally stood along the north side, but today the north edge is topped by a concrete curb and a metal guard rail on wooden posts. A concrete footpath runs parallel to the creek bed beneath the west half of the bridge's west arch.

See also

List of bridges on the National Register of Historic Places in Texas
List of bridges documented by the Historic American Engineering Record in Texas
National Register of Historic Places listings in Travis County, Texas

References

External links

1887 establishments in Texas
Bridges completed in 1887
Bridges in Austin, Texas
Historic American Engineering Record in Texas
National Register of Historic Places in Austin, Texas
Road bridges on the National Register of Historic Places in Texas
Stone arch bridges in the United States